Fred Anderson / DKV Trio is an album by the American jazz saxophonist Fred Anderson with the DKV Trio, composed of drummer Hamid Drake, bassist Kent Kessler and reedist Ken Vandermark. The album was recorded in 1996 and released on Okka Disk. The DKV Trio formed in the summer of 1994 and started performing at Anderson's Velvet Lounge very early in their career. Those meetings led to the idea of doing a record with Fred. "Black Woman", a classic Anderson composition that appears on several of his other recordings, is a tenor sax duet.

Reception

In her review for AllMusic, Joslyn Layne states that "Fred Anderson & DKV Trio cannot disappoint any free-jazz fan; with its lyrical beauty, passion, and warmth, it will convert many a jazz enthusiast who thinks 'free' means 'squalling.'"
The Penguin Guide to Jazz states: "The DKV Trio collaboration was an important turning point in perceptions of Fred Anderson's music, since these younger player were leading something of a charge in contemporary Chicagoan jazz."

Track listing
All compositions by Fred Anderson
 "Planet E" - 8:30
 "Aaron's Tune" - 5:55
 "Black Woman" - 6:09
 "Our Theme" - 5:56
 "Dark Day" - 10:54
 "Lady's in Love" - 10:30

Personnel
Fred Anderson - tenor saxophone
Ken Vandermark - reeds
Kent Kessler - bass
Hamid Drake - percussion

References

1997 albums
Fred Anderson (musician) albums
Ken Vandermark albums
Okka Disk albums